Sahand Rural District is in the Central District of Osku County, East Azerbaijan province, Iran. At the National Census of 2006, its population was 9,480 in 2,625 households. There were 9,933 inhabitants in 3,060 households at the following census of 2011. At the most recent census of 2016, the population of the rural district was 9,339 in 3,049 households. The largest of its six villages was Esfanjan, with 3,544 people.

References 

Osku County

Rural Districts of East Azerbaijan Province

Populated places in East Azerbaijan Province

Populated places in Osku County